Patricia "Pat" Mickan (born 12 March 1957) is an Australian former basketball player.

Biography
Mickan played 150 games for the national team between 1979 and 1989, competing at two Olympic Games; 1984 and 1988. Mickan described her Olympic memories; "I have goose bumps when thinking about it, it's just a very rare and precious experience". Mickan also represented Australia at three World Championships - 1979, 1983 and 1986.

Following her retirement, Mickan went on to become a successful state senior netball and basketball coach. Breaking the barrier for women in sport, Mickan also became the first female specialist skills coach in the Australian Football League with the Adelaide Crows. Her younger brother, Mark, is a former AFL footballer.

Mickan is also a freelance writer and public keynote speaker. In 2013, Mickan was elected to the Australian Basketball Hall of Fame.

References

External links
 
 
 

1957 births
Living people
Australian women's basketball players
Basketball players at the 1984 Summer Olympics
Basketball players at the 1988 Summer Olympics
Basketball players from South Australia
Olympic basketball players of Australia
Australian netball coaches
Australian women's basketball coaches
Esso/Mobil Superleague coaches
Commonwealth Bank Trophy coaches